Gwyn Thomas Jones (February 1912 – 1968) was a professional footballer who played for Merthyr Town, Huddersfield Town, Rochdale, Stockport County and Tranmere Rovers. He was born in Troed-y-rhiw, Wales.

References

1912 births
Year of death missing
Footballers from Merthyr Tydfil
Welsh footballers
Association football defenders
English Football League players
Huddersfield Town A.F.C. players
Rochdale A.F.C. players
Rochdale A.F.C. wartime guest players
Stockport County F.C. players
Tranmere Rovers F.C. players
People from Troed-y-rhiw
Sportspeople from Merthyr Tydfil County Borough